David Bennes Barkley (also known as David B. Barkeley Cantu; March 31, 1899 – November 9, 1918) was posthumously awarded the Medal of Honor for his heroic actions during World War I in France. After successfully completing a scouting mission behind enemy lines he drowned while swimming back across the Meuse River near Pouilly-sur-Meuse.

Biography
Barkley was born in Laredo, Webb County, Texas to Joseph S. Barkley and the former Antonia Cantu. Joseph was a career soldier, and the couple married in Starr County, TX while Joseph was stationed at Ft Ringgold, TX. Deployed to Puerto Rico shortly after David's birth, the family remained in Texas. David grew up with his Mexican-American mother and younger sister while his father remained in the Army. David first enlisted in the Texas National Guard, entering the U.S. Army in April 1917, shortly after the U.S. entered World War I. He enlisted under his legal name, though some claim he used his Anglo father's name only to avoid being segregated into a non-combat unit. 

Arriving in France with the 155th Infantry in August 1918, he was later assigned to Company A, 356th Infantry, 89th Division. Only days before the Armistice, he volunteered for a mission with Sergeant M. Waldo Hatler to swim across the Meuse River near Pouilly-sur-Meuse to get behind German lines and gather information about troop strength and deployments. They were able to gather the needed information; however, returning across the river, Barkley was "seized with cramps and drowned". (This is the exact wording from his citation, duplicated below.) Sergeant Hatler survived to bring the information back to their unit.

Barkley was awarded the Medal of Honor for his actions, one of three Texans to be awarded the Medal of Honor during World War I. Additionally, France awarded him the Croix de Guerre, and Italy the Croce al Merito di Guerra.

Private Barkley lay in state at the Alamo, the second person to receive this honor. He was then buried at the San Antonio National Cemetery.

Rank and organization
Rank and organization: Private, U.S. Army, Company A, 356th Infantry, 89th Division. Place and date: Near Pouilly, France, November 9, 1918. Entered service at: San Antonio, Tex. Birth: Laredo, Tex. G.O. No.: 20, W.D., 1919.
Citation
When information was desired as to the enemy's position on the opposite side of the Meuse River, Pvt. Barkeley, with another soldier, volunteered without hesitation and swam the river to reconnoiter the exact location. He succeeded in reaching the opposite bank, despite the evident determination of the enemy to prevent a crossing. Having obtained his information, he again entered the water for his return, but before his goal was reached, he was seized with cramps and drowned.

In memory
Barkley has received notable posthumous recognition. In 1921, an elementary school in San Antonio, Texas, was named in his honor. On January 10, 1941, a U.S. Army installation, Camp Barkeley, was also named in his honor. A clerical error resulted in the discrepancy in spelling. His mother attended the dedication ceremony and met with surviving members of his unit, and her photo appeared in several Texas newspapers.

David B. Barkley Plaza

A memorial honoring the forty-one Hispanic soldiers who have received the Congressional Medal of Honor was built in Laredo in 2002 and named for Barkley. The David B. Barkley Plaza has a bronze statue of David B. Barkley and an American flag measuring 100 ft by 50 ft and is 308 ft tall making it the tallest flagpole in the United States.

The restored chapel at Laredo Community College is also named in Barkley's honor. Memorial Day and Veterans Day services are held there each year.

Awards and decorations
David Bennes Barkley's awards and decorations include the following:
   Medal of Honor
   Purple Heart with Oak Leaf Cluster.
   World War I Victory Medal
   French Croix de Guerre with Palm medals (2)
   Croce al Merito di Guerra (War Merit Cross)-Italy

See also
 List of Hispanic Medal of Honor recipients
 List of Medal of Honor recipients
 List of Medal of Honor recipients for World War I
 Private Marcelino Serna who also served in the 86th Division and became the most decorated soldier from Texas in World War I.

References

Sources

External links
 

1899 births
1918 deaths
United States Army Medal of Honor recipients
People from Laredo, Texas
Deaths by drowning in France
United States Army soldiers
American military personnel killed in World War I
Recipients of the Croix de Guerre 1914–1918 (France)
Recipients of the War Merit Cross (Italy)
World War I recipients of the Medal of Honor
United States Army personnel of World War I
Military personnel from Texas
Burials in Texas